Cabanadrassus is a monotypic genus of South American ground spiders containing the single species, Cabanadrassus bifasciatus. It was first described by Cândido Firmino de Mello-Leitão in 1941, and has only been found in Argentina.

References

Gnaphosidae
Monotypic Araneomorphae genera
Spiders of Argentina
Taxa named by Cândido Firmino de Mello-Leitão